Nebria patruelis is a species of ground beetle in the Nebriinae subfamily that is endemic to Georgia.

References

patruelis
Beetles described in 1846
Endemic fauna of Georgia (country)
Beetles of Asia